Alberga is a locality situated in Eskilstuna Municipality, Södermanland County, Sweden with 395 inhabitants in 2010.

Alberga is connected to Eskilstuna, Ärla and Västermo with buses operated by Länstrafiken Sörmland.

References 

Populated places in Södermanland County
Populated places in Eskilstuna Municipality